The 1968–69 Cypriot Second Division was the 14th season of the Cypriot second-level football league. Enosis Neon Paralimni FC won their 1st title.

Format
Thirteen teams participated in the 1968–79 Cypriot Second Division. All teams played against each other twice, once at their home and once away. The team with the most points at the end of the season crowned champions. The first team was promoted to 1969–70 Cypriot First Division. The champion was promoted to 1969–70 Cypriot First Division.

League standings

See also
 Cypriot Second Division
 1968–69 Cypriot First Division
 1968–69 Cypriot Cup

References

Cypriot Second Division seasons
Cyprus
1968–69 in Cypriot football